The Kidston Island Lighthouse is a lighthouse on Kidston Island, located in the Bras d'Or lakes, in Baddeck, Nova Scotia. The original lighthouse on Kidston Island was built in 1875.  The present lighthouse was built in 1912 and the two stood side by side for some time. The lighthouse can only be accessed by boat; a ferry operates during the summer months.

See also
List of lighthouses in Canada
Historic Buildings in Baddeck, Nova Scotia
History of Baddeck

References

External links
 Aids to Navigation Canadian Coast Guard

Lighthouses completed in 1875
Lighthouses completed in 1912
Lighthouses in Nova Scotia
Buildings and structures in Victoria County, Nova Scotia
1875 establishments in Canada